Derk Bodde (March 9, 1909November 3, 2003) was an American sinologist and historian of China known for his pioneering work on the history of the Chinese legal system.

Bodde received his undergraduate degree from Harvard University in 1930.  He spent six years (1931-1937) studying in China on a fellowship.  He earned a doctorate in Chinese Studies from the University of Leiden March 3, 1938. When the Fulbright scholarship program was initiated in 1948, Bodde was the first American recipient of a one-year fellowship, which he spent studying in Beijing.

He spent several decades as Professor of Chinese Studies at the University of Pennsylvania, and was a president of the American Oriental Society (1968–69). He was a member of both the American Academy of Arts and Sciences and the American Philosophical Society.

Honors
 Association for Asian Studies (AAS), 1985 Award for Distinguished Contributions to Asian Studies

See also
William P. Alford: current Harvard University scholar of Chinese law
Jerome A. Cohen: current New York University scholar (emeritus) of Chinese law
List of Sinologists

Notes

References

1909 births
2003 deaths
American expatriates in China
American sinologists
Harvard University alumni
Historians from Massachusetts
Historians of China
Legal historians
Leiden University alumni
Scholars of Chinese law
University of Pennsylvania faculty

Members of the American Philosophical Society
Fulbright alumni